The following are historical lists of the youngest members of the United States Congress, in both the House of Representatives and the Senate. These members would be the equivalent to the "Baby of the House" in the parliaments of Commonwealth countries; the U.S. Congress does not confer a similar title upon its youngest members.

The youngest U.S. congressman tends to be older than the youngest MPs in Commonwealth countries. This is partly because the minimum age requirements enumerated in Article One of the United States Constitution bar persons under the age of 25 years and 30 years from serving in the House and Senate, respectively. Additionally, the political culture of the United States encourages young politicians to gain experience in state and local offices before running for Congress. Although the vast majority of members of Congress gained state and local experience before being elected to Congress, members lacking state and local experience have increased recently.

Maxwell Frost (D-FL) is the youngest member of the 118th Congress at age . He succeeded one-term representative Madison Cawthorn, who was the youngest person elected to the U.S. Congress since Jed Johnson Jr. in 1964.

Ossoff is the youngest person elected to the U.S. Senate since Don Nickles in 1980.
The average age of senators is higher now than in the past. In the 19th century, several state legislatures elected senators in their late twenties despite the Constitutional minimum age of 30, such as Henry Clay, who was sworn into office at age 29, and John Henry Eaton, the youngest U.S. senator in history, who took his oath of office when he was  old.

List of youngest U.S. senators 
For senators elected to a regular session, the starting date is the date on which the new Congress convened. From 1789 to 1935, this is March 4 (with the previous Congress ending on March 3); from 1937 onward, this is January 3.

For senators appointed to a vacancy or elected in a special election, the starting date represents their swearing-in date.

List of youngest U.S. representatives
For representatives elected to a regular session, the starting date is the date at which the new Congress convened. From 1789 to 1935, this is March 4 (with the previous Congress ending on March 3); from 1937 onward, this is January 3.

For representatives elected in a special election, the starting date represents their swearing-in date.

See also 
 Age of candidacy laws in the United States
 Dean of the United States House of Representatives
 Dean of the United States Senate

Notes

References 

Sources: Congressional Biographical Directory and House Document No. 108-222, Biographical Directory of the United States Congress 1774 – 2005

Youngest
United States Congress
Youngest
Lists of members of the United States Congress